Oswald Wyndham Lang (December 9, 1893 – September 20, 1981) was a Canadian professional ice hockey player. He played with the Ottawa Senators of the National Hockey Association during the 1916–17 season.

References

1893 births
1981 deaths
Canadian ice hockey goaltenders
Ice hockey people from Ontario
Ottawa Senators (NHA) players
People from Old Toronto